Parviturbo dibellai is a species of sea snail, a marine gastropod mollusk in the family Skeneidae.

Description

Distribution
This species occurs in the Mediterranean Sea off Turkey. It is possibly a Lessepsian immigrant.

References

 Buzzurro G. & Cecalupo A. (2007). I molluschi lessepsiani di Tasucu (Turchia sud-orientale): descrizione di Parviturbo dibellai n. sp. (Gastropoda: Trochoidea: Skeneidae). Bollettino Malacologico 42(1–4): 27–32

dibellai
Gastropods described in 2007